Hiromi Suzuki may refer to:

, Japanese illustrator
, Japanese long-distance runner
, Japanese volleyball player